A referendum for trying the culprits for the national catastrophes () was held in Bulgaria on 19 November 1922. It was approved by 74.33% of voters.

Background
The ruling Bulgarian Agrarian National Union (BANU) sought to prosecute members of the cabinets of the governments led by Ivan Geshov, Stoyan Danev and Aleksandar Malinov motivated by the dissatisfaction of large parts of the populace with the outcome of the Balkan wars and WWI for Bulgaria. After the wars, BANU and other opposition forces and intellectuals classified Bulgaria's territorial loses during 1913 and 1918 as national catastrophes - called in Bulgaria the First and Second national catastrophes, respectively. These terms were frequently used in Bulgaria during the Interwar period. On 24 September 1922, 17 of the 22 ministers were arrested, and a law on prosecution was published on 17 October.

Results

References

1922 referendums
1922 in Bulgaria
Referendums in Bulgaria
November 1922 events